(The) Veiled Prophet may refer to:

Al-Muqanna (fl. 755–783), Iranian religious leader
"The Veiled Prophet of Khorassan", a poem from the 1817 romance Lalla-Rookh by Thomas Moore, loosely based on the life of Al-Muqanna
The Veiled Prophet (opera), an 1877 romantic opera by Charles Villiers Stanford, based on the Moore poem
Veiled Prophet Parade and Ball, annual celebratory events formerly held in St. Louis, Missouri
The Veiled Prophet (novel), a 2007 novel by Richard A. Knaak, set in the Diablo video game universe